TCDD DE36000 are a series of diesel-electric locomotives used by the Turkish State Railways and that are produced by TÜLOMSAŞ in Eskişehir, Turkey under licence from GE.

External links
 Trains of Turkey page on DE36000

General Electric locomotives
Co-Co locomotives
Turkish State Railways diesel locomotives
Standard gauge locomotives of Turkey
Railway locomotives introduced in 2014